The 2015–16 Liga Națională was the 58th season of Romanian Handball League, the top-level men's professional handball league in Romania. The league comprises fourteen teams. Minaur Baia Mare were the defending champions.

Teams

League table

Play-Off

Knockout phase

League table – positions 1–4

League table – positions 5–8

Play-Out

Season statistics

Number of teams by counties

Romanian clubs in European competitions
EHF Champions League
HC Minaur Baia Mare

EHF Cup

CSM București

Dinamo București

Energia Târgu Jiu

EHF Challenge Cup
HC Odorheiu Secuiesc

External links
 Official website

Liga Națională (men's handball)
2015 in Romanian sport
2016 in Romanian sport
2015–16 domestic handball leagues